Agriculture in the Classroom (AITC) is a grassroots program coordinated by the United States Department of Agriculture (USDA) and the National Agriculture in the Classroom Organization. Its goal is to help students gain greater awareness of the role of agriculture in the economy and society, so that they may become citizens who support wise agricultural policies. AITC raises agricultural literacy by helping students understand the farm sources of their food, fabric and flowers.

The program is carried out in each state, according to state needs and interests, by individuals representing farm organizations, agribusiness, education and government.

The USDA supports the state organizations by:
 helping to develop Agriculture in the Classroom programs,
 acting as a central clearinghouse for materials and information,
 encouraging USDA agencies to assist in the state programs, and
 coordinating with national organizations to promote the goal of an increased awareness of agriculture among the nation's students.

History
Throughout much of the history of the United States, agriculture and education have been closely related. During the decades when most Americans lived on farms or in small towns, students often did farm chores before and after school. The school year was determined by planting, cultivating and harvesting schedules. Old school books are full of agricultural references and examples because farming and farm animals were a familiar part of nearly every child's life.

In the 1920s, 30s and 40s, as the farm population shrank and agricultural emphasis decreased in school books and educational materials, educators focused on agriculture as an occupational specialty, rather than an integral part of every student's life. Agriculture education was mainly offered to those few students wanting to make a career of agriculture.

During this period, a small nucleus of educators and others persistently pushed for more agriculture in education. They recognized the interlocking role of farming and food and fiber production with environmental quality, including wildlife habitat, clean water, and the preservation and improvement of forests. They kept interest in agriculture and the environment alive during a period when interest by the public as a whole was decreasing.

During the 1960s and 70s, as experienced agriculture, conservation, and forestry organizations realized the need for quality material, many excellent films, literature, and classroom aids were financed and produced by businesses, foundations, nonprofit groups and associations, as well as state and federal agencies. There was, however, little coordination of effort or exchange of ideas among the groups and no central point for national coordination.

In 1981, at the invitation of the U.S. Department of Agriculture, representatives of agricultural groups and educators came to a meeting in Washington, D.C., to discuss agricultural literacy. A national task force was selected from this group. Representation came from agriculture, business, education, and governmental agencies, some of whom were already conducting educational programs in agriculture.

This new task force recommended that the U.S. Department of Agriculture would be the coordinator and that it would sponsor regional meetings to help states organize their own programs. They also urged the Department to encourage the support of other national groups.

As a result, in 1981, the USDA established Agriculture in the Classroom, which has the endorsement of all living former Secretaries of Agriculture, the National Association of State Departments of Agriculture, the National Conference of States Legislatures, most of the Governors of the States, and the major agricultural organizations and commodity groups. Significant progress has been made through these partnerships of agriculture, business, education, government and dedicated volunteers.

The late Dr. Norman Borlaug, a Nobel prize Laureate, wanted to make it known prior to his death in September 2009 that it was hard for him to stomach the disconnection American students in public education have with agriculture. In a message to Agriculture in the Classroom teachers, Dr. Borlaug encourages the educators that are in public and private schools to develop many more courses on agriculture and food production and also to make it compulsory for students to be enrolled in these classes. Borlaug also takes time to mention that only four percent of children in the industrialized countries and less than two percent in the United States are directly connected to a production-based agriculture farming operation.

Currently, the program is discovering Christmas trees as shown on its website.

Program Delivery

The USDA's national AITC staff consists of a Team Leader, a National Program Leader, a Program Specialist, and a Program Assistant. The staff reports to the Deputy Administrator, Science and Education Resources Development, Cooperative State Research, Education, and Extension Service.

Each state organization addresses agriculture education in a way best suited to its own needs. In some cases, an all-volunteer network is responsible for teacher education and materials distribution. States have formed educational nonprofit organizations, which have the benefit of a tax-deductible status. In some states, leadership is provided through the departments of education, agriculture or other government agencies; in other states, through agriculture organizations or commodity groups, some through universities or colleges, and in some cases, through the dedicated efforts of one or two individuals.

Some state organizations have employed full and/or part-time persons to support Agriculture in the Classroom. A few states have reassigned government agency personnel to lead the AITC efforts. There is no one best method to administer AITC but the combined efforts of volunteers and professional staff are vital ingredients for success.

Regardless of the structure, AITC has advanced because of a cooperative spirit among the participants. There is an AITC presence in every state and territory. Representatives from Canada have attended many USDA-sponsored AITC national conferences and have hosted national conferences in Canada. Requests for information about AITC come from many countries around the world and from other organizations wanting to learn how to deliver their programs with equal success.

The strength of AITC comes from its grassroots organization and the fact that educators are very much a part of the movement. Giant strides have been made since 1981. AITC is regarded as a refreshing and flexible educational program designed to supplement and enhance the teacher's existing curriculum.

People use AITC's eLearning resources in this organization to engage the students on the program.

Materials

Learning materials to support the AITC program are produced by state AITC programs, outside vendors, and the USDA. Many of these are cataloged or accessible from the main AITC website. Examples include the "Growing a Nation" program and "Understanding Avian Influenza." Interactive learning tools and a bimonthly E-zine are  also available on the AITC website.

Conferences
Each year, the National AITC Consortium and the US Department of Agriculture host a conference designed to help teacher, volunteers, state and local coordinators and others learn more about raising students' agricultural literacy. Special speakers, workshops, tours and other special events focus on organizing efforts to enhance the community's knowledge of the sources of their food and fiber.

Volunteering
AITC programs across the country welcome volunteers to help their efforts. Volunteers may distribute materials, organize events, read books to students, coordinate contests and conduct a variety of other tasks. Each state has an AITC coordinator.

Agriculture in the Classroom Consortium
The national Agriculture in the Classroom Consortium is the organization of state AITC programs and professional association of state AITC representatives, whose purpose is to assume and maintain an active national role in promoting agricultural literacy programs by providing leadership and a professional network for state AITC Programs and work to insure continuity of the AITC at USDA.

The AITC Consortium co-sponsors the annual National AITC Conference, coordinates a teacher award program, and helps manage grant programs. It also lobbies on behalf of agricultural literacy and acts as the liaison between AITC and other organizations, businesses and others interested in promoting agricultural literacy. It also compiles data and reports about agricultural literacy.

References

External links
 Agriculture in the Classroom official website

United States Department of Agriculture programs
Education in the United States